Valdeko Valdmäe (until 1937 Valdeko Velt; 5 May 1913 – 20 May 2001) was an Estonian basketballer and volleyballer.

He was born in Tartu. He studied economy at the University of Tartu.

He began his basketball career under the guidance of Herbert Niiler. He played in several clubs: Tartu NMKÜ, Tallinna Kalev, Tartu Kalev. He was a member of Estonian national basketball team.

Following the reoccupation and annexation of Estonia by the Soviet Union In 1944, he fled to Germany where he stayed at Geislingen displaced persons camp. Later he moved to Australia.

He is buried at Sydney's Rookwood Cemetery.

References

1913 births
2001 deaths
Estonian men's basketball players 
KK Kalev players
Estonian men's volleyball players 
University of Tartu alumni
Estonian World War II refugees
Estonian emigrants to Australia
Sportspeople from Tartu